This is an episode summary of British TV comedy show The Morecambe and Wise Show, starring Morecambe and Wise. This was the second show of this title to feature the pair, and was made by Thames Television for broadcast on the ITV network. It ran for a total of four series and seven specials between 1978 and 1983.

Overview

First special (1978)

Eric & Ernie's Xmas Show (1978)

Christmas With Eric & Ernie (1979)

Series One (September–October 1980)

The Morecambe & Wise Christmas Show (1980)

Series Two (September–October 1981)

Eric & Ernie's Christmas Show (1981)

Series Three (October–December 1982)
All episodes were thirty minutes in length with advertisement breaks and shown on a Wednesday evening.

Eric & Ernie's Xmas Show (1982)

Series Four (September–October 1983)
All episodes were thirty minutes in length with advertisement breaks and shown on a Wednesday evening.  Each episode concluded with a No Time For... feature, explaining there was no time left to produce one of the famous plays "wot Ern wrote", with a different subject each week.

Eric & Ernie's Xmas Show (1983)

Home media
In the 1980s, Thames released a pair of VHS tapes; the first was the complete 1980 Christmas show, while the other was a compilation from the three that Morecambe and Wise had produced for the company at that point.

In 2008, the Network imprint released a two-DVD set containing the full first series with Thames Television, as well as the very first Thames episode, and the Christmas shows from 1978, 1979 and 1980.

In 2021, Network announced plans to release the remaining three series, and all of the specials, in a box set of all of the duo's work with Thames Television, with edits, along with a larger box set containing all of their existing output for ITV, including all of the remaining episodes of Two of a Kind, their 1961–1968 series for ATV. Additionally, a separate release of the pair's Christmas specials for Thames was also announced.

See also
List of Two of a Kind episodes (ATV series)
List of The Morecambe & Wise Show (1968 TV series) episodes (BBC series)

References

External links
Morecambe & Wise website
Eric And Ern – Keeping The Magic Alive  **Book, Film, TV Reviews, Interviews**

ITV-related lists
Lists of British comedy television series episodes
Episodes